The Peppermint Tree & the Seeds of Superconsciousness is a 2008 album by the Amorphous Androgynous, it was released on the webpage of The Future Sound of London (FSOL) to buy as a digital download and was released on CD in June 2008.

Musically it is in a similar vein to the two preceding Amorphous Androgynous albums, The Isness and Alice In Ultraland, with influences of psychedelia and progressive rock, although bearing more in common with the latter's funk and blues experiments and ambient interludes between tracks.

It is described in the notes as "A collection of psychedelic relics from The Amorphous Androgynous, 1967-2007".

Track listing
 The Peppermint Tree (5:49)
 Given That We've Given (3:05)
 I Have Loved You Into Oblivion (5:28)
 Light Beyond Sound (1:57)
 In Fear Of The Electromagnetic Machine (Part 1) (1:54)
 Somewhere At The Edge Of Nowhere (1:01)
 Riders (On The Circadian Rhythms) (4:14)
 Carousel (0:38)
 Yantra (3:54)
 Opus Of The Black Sun (6:29)
 Marylebone Road (4:12)
 Tiny Space Birds (5:02)
 Drifter (3:33)
 Rocket Fuel (4:41)
 Listen Little Man (3:54)
 Man Is A Virus In Shoes (2:35)
 Mr. Sponge's Groovy Oscillations (3:12)
 It's A Sunshine Day (Yeah! Yeah!) (4:25)
 An Absurd Consequence Of Living In Absurd Times (3:11)

Crew
FSOL

References

External links
 

The Future Sound of London albums
2008 albums